Enhanced Video Object, also known as Enhanced VOB, EVOB or EVO, is a container format for HD DVD video media. It contains the actual digital video, digital audio, subtitle and DVD menu contents in stream form. It is an extension to VOB. It can contain video encoded in H.264/MPEG-4 AVC, VC-1, or H.262/MPEG-2 Part 2 and audio encoded in AC-3, E-AC-3, Dolby TrueHD, DTS, DTS-HD, PCM, and MPEG-2 Part 3.

There are a few consumer software solutions that can play EVO files, such as PowerDVD, WinDVD for Windows and FFmpeg for Linux (unprotected EVO only), and the cross platform VLC Player.

References

External links
 
 Videohelp.com - What is Blu-ray Disc and HD DVD? - folder and file structure
 Cutting Master Format for HD DVD-ROM and 3X SPEED DVD ROM (HD DVD CMF) Ver. 1.0
 HD DVD – A technical introduction

DVD